Trud is a rural locality (a settlement) in Ostrogozhsk, Ostrogozhsky District, Voronezh Oblast, Russia. The population was 61 as of 2010. There are four streets.

Geography 
Trud is located 12 km northwest of Ostrogozhsk (the district's administrative centre) by road. Ternovoye is the nearest rural locality.

References 

Rural localities in Ostrogozhsky District